I've Found Someone of My Own is the only album by The Free Movement and was released in 1972.  It reached No. 26 on the US R&B album chart and No. 167 on the Billboard 200 chart.

The album featured three singles: "I've Found Someone of My Own", which reached No. 5 on the Billboard Hot 100, "The Harder I Try (The Bluer I Get)", which reached No. 6 on the US adult contemporary chart, and "Love the One You're With" which did not chart.

Track listing 
All songs written by Frank F. Robinson except where noted.
 "I've Found Someone of My Own" – 3:44
 "Land Where I Live" (H. Hilton/William Flemister) – 2:56
 "Son of the Zulu King" (Chick Carlton) – 5:04
 "If Only You Believe" (Brian Potter/Dennis Lambert) – 2:47
 "Love the One You're With" (Stephen Stills) – 3:45
 "The Harder I Try (The Bluer I Get)" – 3:26
 "Comin' Home" – 2:58
 "I Know I Could Love You Better (The Second Time Around)" (Bobby Arvon) – 3:21
 "Your Love Has Grown Cold" (Michael Omartian) – 2:55
 "Could You Believe in a Dream" (Al Jarreau) – 4:16
 "Where Do We Go from Here" (Mike Settle) – 3:41

Personnel 
Adrian Jefferson, Cheryl Conley, Claude Jefferson, Godoy Colbert, Jennifer Gates, & Josephine Brown – vocals
Bill Straw – executive producer
Michael Omartian – arranger, producer (tracks 1, 3–11), piano
Toxey French – arranger, producer (tracks 1, 3–11)
Joe Porter – producer (track 2)
Jimmie Haskell – arranger
Ben Benay & Jerry McGhee – guitars
Jerry Scheff & Bobby West – bass
Gene Pello – drums
Milt Holland & Victor Feldman – percussion
Bobbye Hall – congas
King Erison – congas

Charts 

Singles

References 

1972 debut albums
Albums produced by Michael Omartian
Columbia Records albums